Ringers: Lord of the Fans is a 2005 documentary film investigating the growth of the Tolkien fandom all the way from the release of The Hobbit book by J. R. R. Tolkien in 1937 to Peter Jackson's The Lord of the Rings trilogy (2001–2003).

The film tells about the early days of the Tolkien fandom when it was part of the hippie culture and influenced many people in the pop world, some of whom became famous and are interviewed, including David Carradine, and Lemmy of Motörhead. Ringers includes Leonard Nimoy (Spock in Star Trek) performing "The Ballad of Bilbo Baggins."

The Mythopoeic Society and the Tolkien Society are mentioned. The film also tells the story of the cartoon version of The Hobbit and The Lord of the Rings  animated films. The success of the Peter Jackson films is described through interviews with Jackson and the stars of the trilogy.

The film is narrated by Dominic Monaghan.

Awards
Ringers: Lord of the Fans won the award for Outstanding Achievement in a Documentary at the 2005 Newport Beach Film Festival and was nominated for Best DVD Release at the 2006 Saturn Awards.

References

External links

2005 films
2005 comedy films
Tolkien fandom
Tolkien studies
American documentary films
Documentary films about fandom
Films produced by Tom DeSanto
2000s English-language films
2000s American films